Gvido Miezis (born 9 September 1980) is a Latvian cyclist. He competed in the men's track time trial at the 2000 Summer Olympics.

References

1980 births
Living people
Latvian male cyclists
Olympic cyclists of Latvia
Cyclists at the 2000 Summer Olympics
People from Ventspils